Sara Jovanović (born 29 October 1993), professionally known as Sara Jo (pronounced "yo"), is a Serbian singer, songwriter, dancer, model and actress. She rose to prominence as the second runner-up on the singing competition Prvi glas Srbije in 2012. As a member of Moje 3, Jovanović then represented Serbia in the Eurovision Song Contest 2013 with "Ljubav je svuda".

She was also nominated for the Best Adria Act at the 2017 MTV Europe Music Awards.

Early life
Jovanović was born on 29 October 1993 in Rome and was raised bilingually in Serbian and Italian. She is the only child of parents Jasna and Saša Jovanović. Her mother was a kindergarten teacher, and her father was a Ministry of Foreign Affairs official. She displayed interest in music and performance from an early age, practicing ballet and hip-hop dance. Jovanović cites late 90's and early 00's performers like Britney Spears, TLC, Jennifer Lopez and Destiny's Child as her biggest influences in music.

In 2009, the family eventually permanently relocated to Belgrade, where Sara graduated from the Third Grammar School. She subsequently studied Italian language at the University of Belgrade Faculty of Philology.

Life and career

2011–2016: Career beginnings, Prvi glas Srbije and Eurovision with Moje 3

Jovanović began her music career in 2011 by winning a contest organized by Serbian magazine Story with covers she had been posting on YouTube. As a reward she received a chance to record her first song, titled "Zauvek" (Forever), which she performed on the late-night talk show Veče sa Ivanom Ivanovićem. The following year, Jovanović was also featured on four songs released by rapper MCN for his self-titled debut album.

In 2012, she auditioned for the second season of Serbian televised singing competition Prvi glas Srbije, singing "Halo" in front of judges Vlado Georgiev, Aleksandra Radović and Saša Milošević Mare. After progressing through the "bootcamp" phase, mentored by Radović, Jovanović went on to the live shows, where she was noted for her showmanship, and thus was cited as the "new energy on the music scene" by Serbian Cosmopolitan. After nine weeks of competing, Jovanović reached the final where she finished as the second runner-up, behind Nevena Božović and Mirna Radulović.

In February of the following year, it was announced that the three finalists from Prvi glas Srbije would form a girl group called Moje 3 in order to compete at the 2013 Beosong music festival. At the beginning of March, they performed "Ljubav je svuda" (Love Is All Around), winning with 42.5% of the public votes and becoming Serbian representatives for the Eurovision Song Contest 2013 in Malmö, Sweden. During the first semi-finals of Eurovision, which took place on May 14, Moje 3 performed as the last act of the evening, eventually placing 11th with 46 points, and thus failing to progress to the final. Furthermore, they received the Barbara Dex Award for the worst dressed act.

Following the Eurovision, Jovanović pursued a solo career with "Ujutru" (In the Morning), released under IDJTunes, in collaboration with Marko Mandić, which was featured on his 2015 debut EP. Between September and December, she appeared on the first Serbian series of Your Face Sounds Familiar, winning in the 10th episode with the performance of "Unconditionally" as Katy Perry. In the final on December 28, she took second place, behind the season winner, Ana Kokić. At the beginning of 2014, Jovanović covered "Provokacija" (Provocation) by Montenegrin singer Boban Rajović for the movie Little Buddho. In June, Sara released her debut solo single, titled "Ko je ovde ko" (Who's Who Here), again under IDJTunes. In March 2015, she released the ballad "Mahovina" (Moss) and, later in July 2016, reggae-infused "Probaj" (Try It). Jovanović reunited with Marko Mandić in October 2016 to cover Moby Dick's "Troje" (The Three) for the film The Samurai in Autumn. She portrayed Cinderella as a main role in a musical, which premiered at Belgrade's Sava Centar on December 25, and later toured in theaters around Serbia.

2017–2021: New image and more significant success
In 2017, Jovanović signed with Belgrade-based hip hop record label Bassivity Music, releasing her electropop single "Nemam vremena za to" (I Don't Have Time for That) in May, produced by Coby. The song's music video has accumulated over ten million views on YouTube, becoming her highest grossing single to date. In the same year, Jovanović also collaborated with Universal Music Serbia for Tuborg GreenFest on the single "Samo ti" (Only You), which samples Major Lazer's "Tuborg Beat", courtesy of Mad Decent. By the end of 2017, she was nominated for the Best Adria Act at the 2017 MTV Europe Music Awards. In May of the following year, she released "Lava".

The single "Bez sna" (No Sleep) was released at the beginning of 2019, followed by "Mili, mili" (Honey, Honey) in July. During the summer of 2019, Jovanović embarked on a regional tour, performing at music festivals such as Exit. Same year she starred in several episodes of the popular Serbian television series Sinđelići. She also served as a mentor in a singing contest organized by Coca-Cola, called Discovered by Coke. Her contestant, Predrag Simić, with whom she also released a song, titled "Kao nikad pre" (Like Never Before), as a part of the competition, was eventually proclaimed the winner.

In January 2020, Jovanović performed a medley of her hits at the 2020 Music Awards Ceremony. Her single "Kaži mi" (Tell Me) was released in April of the same year. In July, she covered "Neko te ima noćas" (Someone Has You Tonight) by Van Gogh as a part of the Radio S' project Zvezde pevaju zvezde (Stars Sing Stars).

The following year, Jovanović voiced Lola Bunny in Serbian adaptation of Space Jam: A New Legacy. Then in July, she collaborated with the singer-songwriter Edita on their duet "Varalica" (Cheater). In October, she released the lead single "Divlja" (Wild) from her upcoming debut album. At the end of 2021, it was announced by the administration of Belgrade that Jovanović, alongside Marija Šerifović and Jelena Karleuša, would perform in front of the House of the National Assembly of the Republic of Serbia for the New Year's Eve. In December, she was featured on the single "On" (Him) by Croatian singer Franka.

2022–present: Pesma za Evroviziju '22 and the upcoming debut album 
Jovanović's entry, titled "Muškarčina" (Manly Man), for the music festival organized by the Radio Television of Serbia to choose Serbian representative for the Eurovision Song Contest 2022 was presented on 8 February. The song, written by Coby and Bojana Vunturišević, draws from Serbian folk music and was described as experimental pop. By the day of the national competition's first semi-final, 3 March, "Muškarčina" collected most views on YouTube out of 36 entries. The second most-viewed entry, "Zorja" by Zorja, accumulated half as many views. Ultimately, after she had been promoted to the final of the national selection, which took place on 5 March, Jovanović finished as the runner-up to "In corpore sano" (In a Healthy Body) by Konstrakta. On 8 March, Reksona, the CEO of Bassivity Music, announced that Jovanović would release her album "in the next few months". In Late June, Sara presented "Zar ne" (Right[?]) at the Skale music festival in Herceg Novi, Montenegro.

Public image

Style
In addition to her music, Sara Jo has been recognized for her fashion style. She has served as a trademark face for Adidas in Serbia since the beginnings of her career with the single "Ko je ovde ko" (2014).

Philanthropy
In November 2013, Jovanović collaborated with artists Tropico Band and Dženan Lončarević, alongside songwriter Andrej Ilić on a charity single, titled "Molio sam anđele" (I Begged the Angels). The proceeds from the single went to the treatment for a twenty-two-year-old woman suffering from bone cancer.

She has also been noted for using her fame as a platform to advocate for LGBT rights. Jovanović held her first performance at the Belgrade Pride in September 2019, when she received the title of the Pride's "godmother". Throughout 2021, she had been advocating for the legalization of same-sex partnerships in Serbia and performed at the closing ceremony of the WorldPride event in Copenhagen alongside Serbian drag queens Alex Electra and Dita Von Bill.

In 2020, Jovanović held a speech at the TEDxMasarikova conference in Zenica, in which she reflected on personal struggles regarding fame. Since 2021, she has also served as an ambassador of the Council of Europe against hate speech.

Personal life
Jovanović was in a year-long relationship with volleyball player Aleksandar Atanasijević, which was ended in May 2014. In February 2015, she was reported to be dating Serbian actor Viktor Savić. The couple broke up the following year. Between 2016 and 2018, she was then romantically involved with rapper and writer Marčelo.

Jovanović is close friends with fashion influencer Dunja Jovanić and is often featured in her vlogs. The two of them were depicted in the road trip reality television series JoJo na točkovima (JoJo On Wheels) in 2020.

Discography

Singles

As lead artist

Promotional singles

Other appearances

Filmography

Film

Television

Music videos

Awards and nominations

References

External links 

1993 births
English-language singers from Serbia
Eurovision Song Contest entrants of 2013
Italian-language singers
Living people
Eurovision Song Contest entrants for Serbia
21st-century Serbian women singers
Serbian pop singers
Serbian television personalities
Indexi Award winners
Singers from Rome
Singers from Belgrade
Italian people of Serbian descent
Pesma za Evroviziju contestants